BEN domain containing 4 is a protein that in humans is encoded by the BEND4 gene.

References

Further reading